A firelog is a manufactured log constructed to be used as wood fuel. Firelogs are designed to be inexpensive, while being easier to ignite, and burn longer, and more efficiently than firewood. Firelogs are traditionally manufactured using two methods: the first uses only compressed sawdust and the second uses sawdust and paraffin, which is mixed and extruded into a log shape. The extruded firelogs are individually wrapped in paper packaging which can be ignited to start burning the firelog as the paraffin is readily combustible.

Types
A new cleaner firelog has now been developed using waste fibre from the oil palm fruit bunches of South East Asia. Unlike sawdust logs, these burn with zero sulfur emissions. Also unlike sawdust logs, no trees need to be felled to produce these firelogs. Other new types of firelogs include one made from waste wax-cardboard such as that used in the packing of perishable foods for shipment, which is used to create a compressed cardboard firelog, and another made from renewable Greek cotton plants, offering a high energy content.

The materials used for a traditional firelog are variable, the sawdust used is often commercial wood waste from manufacturers, or waste agricultural biomass (nut shells, fruit pits, etc.); additionally bio-wax may be used in lieu of paraffin (petroleum-based wax). 

There are wood and wax firelogs made using renewable materials. These are made using plant or animal based renewable waxes such as palm oil. These logs can be considered to be carbon neutral firelogs, as during combustion the carbon released is the same carbon absorbed when the plants are growing. Sulphur emissions are virtually eliminated with renewable firelogs as they do not contain paraffin waxes.

Energy content

See also
 Firewood
 Wood fuel
 Wood briquette
 Wood pellet

References

Fuels
Wood fuel